George Henry Pope (27 January 1911 – 29 October 1993) was an English cricketer, who played for Derbyshire from 1933 to 1948, and in one Test for England in 1947.

He played 169 matches for Derbyshire, and as a bowler, he took 677 wickets at 19.92; as a batsman he had a career average of 28.05. He missed most of Derbyshire's Championship season in 1936 through injury, but improved steadily as both batsman and bowler before the war and came close to a Test place (he was in the party for Trent Bridge in 1938 and was chosen for the abortive tour of India in 1939–40). He missed 1946 because he was committed to League cricket but in 1947 he received his one cap, against South Africa at Lord's. In 1948 he did the double for the second time - hitting 207 not out at Portsmouth - but promptly decided to retire to Jersey because of his wife's health. He came back to play more League cricket and stand as a first-class umpire between 1966 and 1974. He was mellower by then. The writer Michael Parkinson recalled playing a League game against Sheffield, when they were effectively Mr Pope's XI. He would rap you on the pads, look ruefully down the wicket and say to himself: `Nice little leg-cutter that, George. Just a little bit too much, perhaps. What do you think, Mr Umpire?' And the poor besotted creature was bound to agree, as he invariably did the next time Mr Pope struck the pads and this time bellowed a demand for lbw.

Life and career
Pope was born at Tibshelf, Derbyshire, and followed his older brother Alf Pope into the Derbyshire side in 1933. He made his debut in an innings victory against Worcestershire and played one more first-class match that season. He became a regular player in 1934 and 1935. In 1936 a cartilage injury early in the season caused him to miss all but a handful of matches in the county's County Championship-winning side. He returned in 1937 and scored more than 1,000 runs with 92 wickets, and toured India with Lord Tennyson's XI in 1937–38.

Pope was Derbyshire's leading all-rounder in both 1938 and 1939, achieving the all-rounder's double of 1,000 runs and 100 wickets in 1938. He played League cricket in 1946, the first season after World War II, but returned to Derbyshire for 1947, when he took 114 wickets. He was back again in 1948, when he completed the second double of his career and made his highest score, an unbeaten 207 against Hampshire at Portsmouth, sharing an unbroken seventh wicket stand of 241 with Albert Rhodes that remained the county's record until 2000.

Pope's Test career had one false start. In 1938, he was picked in the party for the Trent Bridge match against Australia and then discarded from the final eleven. Finally, he played in the Lord's Test of 1947 against South Africa, but took only one tail-end wicket and was dropped.

At the end of the 1948 season, Pope announced his immediate retirement to move to the Channel Islands to look after his wife, who was ill. He returned to first-class cricket on the Commonwealth XI tour of India, Pakistan and Ceylon in 1949–50, but at the end of that he retired for good.

Pope was a right hand batsman and played 312 innings in 205 first-class matches, with an average of 28.05. He made eight centuries, with a top score of 207 not out. He was a right-arm fast-medium bowler, and took 677 first-class wickets at average of 19.92, and a best performance of 8 for 38, amongst his forty five wicket hauls.

From 1966 to 1974, Pope stood as a first-class umpire in English county matches, returning for one last match as umpire in 1976.

He died in Chesterfield, Derbyshire, at the age of 82. As well as his elder brother Alf, his younger brother, Harold Pope, also played for Derbyshire.

References

1911 births
1993 deaths
England Test cricketers
English cricketers
Derbyshire cricketers
Commonwealth XI cricketers
English cricket umpires
Players cricketers
English cricketers of 1919 to 1945
L. H. Tennyson's XI cricket team